Nerkoonjärvi (Kihniö) is a medium-sized lake of Pirkanmaa region in Finland. It belongs to Kokemäenjoki main catchment area and it is situated on Kihniö municipality.

See also
List of lakes in Finland

References

Lakes of Kihniö